Turpentine (which is also called spirit of turpentine, oil of turpentine, terebenthene, terebinthine and  (colloquially) turps) is a fluid obtained by the distillation of resin harvested from living trees, mainly pines.  Mainly used as a specialized solvent, it is also a source of material for organic syntheses.

Turpentine is composed of terpenes, primarily the monoterpenes alpha- and beta-pinene, with lesser amounts of carene, camphene, dipentene, and terpinolene. Mineral turpentine or other petroleum distillates are used to replace turpentine – although the constituent chemicals are very different.

Etymology 
The word turpentine derives (via French and Latin) from the Greek word τερεβινθίνη terebinthine, in turn the feminine form (to conform to the feminine gender of the Greek word, which means "resin") of an adjective (τερεβίνθινος) derived from the Greek noun (τερέβινθος) for the terebinth tree.

Although the word originally referred to the resinous exudate of terebinth trees (e.g. Chios turpentine, Cyprus turpentine, and Persian turpentine), it now refers to that of coniferous trees, namely crude turpentine (e.g. Venice turpentine is the oleoresin of larch), or the volatile oil part thereof, namely oil (spirit) of turpentine; the later usage is much more common today.

Source trees

Important pines for turpentine production include: maritime pine (Pinus pinaster), Aleppo pine (Pinus halepensis), Masson's pine (Pinus massoniana), Sumatran pine (Pinus merkusii), longleaf pine (Pinus palustris), loblolly pine (Pinus taeda), slash pine (Pinus elliottii), and ponderosa pine (Pinus ponderosa).

To tap into the sap producing layers of the tree, turpentiners used a combination of hacks to remove the pine bark. Once debarked, pine trees secrete crude turpentine (oleoresin) onto the surface of the wound as a protective measure to seal the opening, resist exposure to micro-organisms and insects, and prevent vital sap loss. Turpentiners wounded trees in V-shaped streaks down the length of the trunks to channel the crude turpentine into containers. It was then collected and processed into spirits of turpentine. Crude turpentine yield may be increased by as much as 40% by applying paraquat herbicides to the exposed wood.

The V-shaped cuts are called "catfaces" for their resemblance to a cat's whiskers. These marks on a pine tree signify it was used to collect resin for turpentine production.

Converting crude turpentine to oil of turpentine
Crude turpentine collected from the trees may be evaporated by steam distillation in a copper still.  Molten rosin remains in the still bottoms after turpentine has been distilled out. Such turpentine is called gum turpentine. The term gum turpentine may also refer to crude turpentine, which may cause some confusion.

Turpentine may alternatively be extracted from destructive distillation of pine wood, such as shredded pine stumps, roots, and slash, using the light end of the heavy naphtha fraction (boiling between ) from a crude oil refinery. Such turpentine is called wood turpentine. Multi-stage counter-current extraction is commonly used so fresh naphtha first contacts wood leached in previous stages and naphtha laden with turpentine from previous stages contacts fresh wood before vacuum distillation to recover naphtha from the turpentine. Leached wood is steamed for additional naphtha recovery prior to burning for energy recovery.

Sulfate turpentine 
When producing chemical wood pulp from pines or other coniferous trees, sulfate turpentine may be condensed from the gas generated in Kraft process pulp digesters. The average yield of crude sulfate turpentine is 5–10 kg/t pulp.  Unless burned at the mill for energy production, sulfate turpentine may require additional treatment measures to remove traces of sulfur compounds.

Industrial and other end uses

Solvent
As a solvent, turpentine is used for thinning oil-based paints, for producing varnishes, and as a raw material for the chemical industry. Its use as a solvent in industrialized nations has largely been replaced by the much cheaper turpentine substitutes obtained from petroleum such as white spirit. A solution of turpentine and beeswax or carnauba wax has long been used as a furniture wax.

Source of organic compounds
Turpentine is also used as a source of raw materials in the synthesis of fragrant chemical compounds. Commercially used camphor, linalool, alpha-terpineol, and geraniol are all usually produced from alpha-pinene and beta-pinene, which are two of the chief chemical components of turpentine. These pinenes are separated and purified by distillation. The mixture of diterpenes and triterpenes that is left as residue after turpentine distillation is sold as rosin.

Medicinal elixir
Turpentine and petroleum distillates such as coal oil and kerosene have been used medicinally since ancient times, as topical and sometimes internal home remedies. Topically, it has been used for abrasions and wounds, as a treatment for lice, and when mixed with animal fat it has been used as a chest rub, or inhaler for nasal and throat ailments. Vicks chest rubs still contain turpentine in their formulations, although not as an active ingredient.

Turpentine, now understood to be dangerous for consumption, was a common medicine among seamen during the Age of Discovery. It was one of several products carried aboard Ferdinand Magellan's fleet during the first circumnavigation of the globe. Taken internally it was used as a treatment for intestinal parasites. This is dangerous, due to the chemical's toxicity.

Turpentine enemas, a very harsh purgative, had formerly been used for stubborn constipation or impaction. Turpentine enemas were also given punitively to political dissenters in post-independence Argentina.

Niche uses
 Turpentine is also added to many cleaning and sanitary products due to its antiseptic properties and its "clean scent". 
 In early 19th-century America, turpentine was sometimes burned in lamps as a cheap alternative to whale oil. It was most commonly used for outdoor lighting, due to its strong odour. A blend of ethanol and turpentine called camphine served as the dominant lamp fuel replacing whale oil until the advent of kerosene.  
 In 1946, Soichiro Honda fueled the first Honda motorcycles with a blend of gasoline and turpentine, due to the scarcity of gasoline in Japan following World War II. 
 In his book If Only They Could Talk, veterinarian and author James Herriot describes the use of the reaction of turpentine with resublimed iodine to "drive the iodine into the tissue" - or perhaps just impress the watching customer with a spectacular treatment (a dense cloud of purple smoke).
 Turpentine was added extensively into gin during the Gin Craze.

Hazards

As an organic solvent, its vapour can irritate the skin and eyes, damage the lungs and respiratory system, as well as the central nervous system when inhaled, and cause damage to the renal system when ingested, among other things. Ingestion can cause burning sensations, abdominal pain, nausea, vomiting, confusion, convulsions, diarrhea, tachycardia, unconsciousness, respiratory failure, and chemical pneumonia. 

The Occupational Safety and Health Administration (OSHA) has set the legal limit (permissible exposure limit) for turpentine exposure in the workplace as 100 ppm (560 mg/m3) over an 8-hour workday. The same threshold was adopted by the National Institute for Occupational Safety and Health (NIOSH) as the recommended exposure limit (REL). At levels of 800 ppm (4480 mg/m3), turpentine is immediately dangerous to life and health.

See also
 
 
 McCranie's Turpentine Still
 
 
 
 , a water-resistant leather, using a birch oil distillate similar to turpentine in its manufacture.
  / / Mineral spirit

References

External links

 Inchem.org, IPCS INCHEM Turpentine classification, hazard, and property table.
 CDC - NIOSH Pocket Guide to Chemical Hazards - Turpentine
 FAO.org, Gum naval stores: Turpentine and rosin from pine resin
 FloridaMemory.com, Florida State Archive photographs of turpentine camps and laborers
 HCHSonline.org, Timber and Turpentine Industries
 Distil my beating heart
 Florida's "Turpmtine" Camps
 Turpentine Industry at A History of Central Florida Podcast

Household chemicals
Hydrocarbon solvents
Painting materials
Patent medicines
Resins
Terpenes and terpenoids
Papermaking
Non-timber forest products